The Rural Municipality of Enniskillen No. 3 is a rural municipality (RM) in the Canadian province of Saskatchewan within Census Division No. 1 and  Division No. 1. Located in the southeast portion of the province, it is adjacent to the United States border, neighbouring Burke County and Renville County both in North Dakota.

History
The RM of Enniskillen No. 3 incorporated as a rural municipality on December 13, 1909. Sam McKnight came to the area from Durham County, Ontario, and served as chairman of the organizing committee for the RM. He seemed to have had his heart set on a northern Irish name, since his committee proposed Enniskillen, Derry, Antrim, Boyne, Alma, Fermanagh and Waterloo. The government selected the first name on the list which honours Enniskillen (inis Ceithleann, "Ceithle's island"), the country town of Fermanagh, Northern Ireland.

Geography

Communities and localities
The following urban municipalities are surrounded by the RM.

Towns
 Oxbow

Villages
 Glen Ewen

The following unincorporated communities are within the RM.

Localities
 Boscurvis
 Elcott
 Northgate
 Openshaw

Demographics

Government
The RM of Enniskillen No. 3 is governed by an elected municipal council and an appointed administrator that meets on the second Tuesday of every month. The reeve of the RM is Trevor Walls while its administrator is Pamela Bartlett. The RM's office is located in Oxbow.

See also
List of rural municipalities in Saskatchewan

References 

E
Division No. 1, Saskatchewan